Alexander II (Gr. , died 48 or 47 BC), or Alexander Maccabeus, was the eldest son of Aristobulus II, king of Judaea.  He married his cousin Alexandra Maccabeus, daughter of his uncle, Hyrcanus II.  Their grandfather was Alexander Jannaeus, the second eldest son of John Hyrcanus.  Mariamne, the daughter of Alexander and Alexandra, was Herod the Great's second wife and Hasmonean queen of the Jewish kingdom.

Alexander was taken prisoner, with his father and his brother  Antigonus, by the Roman general Pompey, on the capture of Jerusalem in 63 BC, but escaped his captors as they were being conveyed to Rome.  In 57 he appeared in Judaea, raised an army of 10,000 infantry and 1500 cavalry, and fortified Alexandrium and other strong posts.  Alexander's uncle Hyrcanus (with whom Alexander's father Aristobulus had clashed) applied for aid to Aulus Gabinius, the Roman proconsul of Syria, who brought a large army against Alexander, and sent one of his cavalry commanders, the young Mark Antony in his first military command, with a body of troops in advance.  In a decisive battle near Jerusalem, Alexander was soundly defeated, and took refuge in the fortress of Alexandrium.  Through the mediation of his mother, he was permitted to depart, on condition of surrendering all the fortresses still in his power.  In the following year, during the expedition of Gabinius into Egypt, Alexander again incited the Jews to revolt, and collected an army. He massacred all the Romans who fell in his way and besieged the rest, who had taken refuge on Mount Gerizim.  After rejecting the terms of peace which were offered to him by Gabinius, he was defeated near Mount Tabor with the loss of 10,000 men.  The spirit of his adherents, however, was not entirely crushed, for in 53, on the death of Marcus Licinius Crassus, he again collected some forces, but was compelled to come to terms by Cassius in 52. Three years later, in 49 BC, Caesar's Civil War broke out, and Julius Caesar set Alexander's father Aristobulus II free, and sent him to Judaea to further his interests there.  He was poisoned on the journey, and Alexander, who was preparing to support him, was seized at the command of Pompey, and beheaded at Antioch.

References

 
 

48 BC deaths
Hasmonean dynasty
Jews and Judaism in the Roman Republic
People executed by the Roman Republic
Year of birth unknown
1st-century BC executions
1st-century BCE Jews
People executed by decapitation